is a town located in Ito District, Wakayama Prefecture, Japan. , the town had an estimated population of 3,996 in 1770 households and a population density of 91 persons per km².

Geography 
Kudoyama is located near the prefectural border at the northeastern end of Wakayama Prefecture, on the south bank of the Kinokawa River, and consists of a valley formed along the Fudodani River that flows into it, and a valley formed by the Nyu River that flows into it from the east.

Neighbouring municipalities 
Wakayama Prefecture
 Hashimoto
 Katsuragi
 Kōya

Climate
Kudoyama has a Humid subtropical climate (Köppen Cfa) characterized by warm summers and cool winters with light to no snowfall.  The average annual temperature in Kudoyama is 13.3 °C. The average annual rainfall is 1781 mm with September as the wettest month. The temperatures are highest on average in August, at around 25.1 °C, and lowest in January, at around 1.8 °C.

Demographics
Per Japanese census data, the population of Kudoyama has declined steadily over the last 70 years.

History
The area of the modern town of Kudoyama was within ancient Kii Province and was long associated with Mount Koya. In the Heian period, the temple of Jison-in, which had the grave of the mother of Kūkai. During the Sengoku period, it was the location of exile for Sanada Masayuki and Sanada Yukimura. The village of Kudyama was established with the creation of the modern municipalities system on April 1, 1889, and was raised to town status on September 1, 1910. The village of Kane was annexed by Kudoyama on March 31, 1955.

Government
Kudoyama has a mayor-council form of government with a directly elected mayor and a unicameral town council of 10 members. Kudoyama collectively with the town of Kōya, contributes one member to the Wakayama Prefectural Assembly. In terms of national politics, the town is part of Wakayama 2nd district of the lower house of the Diet of Japan.

Economy
The economy of Kudoyama is centered on horticulture and seasonal tourism. The town has long been regarded as the gateway to the temples of Mount Koya. The production of washi paper is a local handicraft.

Education
Kudoyama has three public elementary schools and two public middle schools operated by the town government. The town does not have a high school.

Transportation

Railway 
 Nankai Electric Railway – Nankai Kōya Line
 Kudoyama - Kōyashita - Shimo-Kosawa - Kami-Kosawa

Highway

Local attractions
Sacred Sites and Pilgrimage Routes in the Kii Mountain Range
Kōyasan chōishi-michi
Niukanshōfu Shrine
Jison-in temple

Notable people from Kudoyama
Takao Obana, manager of the Yokohama BayStars
Masanori Sugiura, Olympic baseball player

References

External links

Kudoyama official website 

Towns in Wakayama Prefecture
Kudoyama, Wakayama